Tiago Brandão Rodrigues (born 1977) is a Portuguese politician who served as Minister of Education from 26 November 2015 until 30 March 2022. He has a PhD in biochemistry from the University of Coimbra. Rodrigues was elected by the Viana do Castelo constituency to the Assembly of the Republic in 2015 and 2022.

UEFA inquiry into the 2022 Champions League Final chaos
On 30 May, UEFA announced they were commissioning an independent report into the chaotic events surrounding the 2022 UEFA Champions League Final to examine the decision making, responsibility and behaviours of all entities involved in the events at the Stade de France, in which Liverpool supporters were tear-gassed by French Police, and would be led by Rodrigues on a pro bono basis. The report will be made public upon its completion, with UEFA evaluating the next steps to take.

References

1977 births
Living people
Portuguese politicians
Education ministers of Portugal
People from Braga
University of Coimbra alumni
Members of the Assembly of the Republic (Portugal)
Socialist Party (Portugal) politicians